Leo Weilenmann (29 September 1922 – 6 January 1999) was a Swiss racing cyclist. He raced in the 1947 and 1951 Tour de France.

References

External links

1922 births
1999 deaths
Swiss male cyclists
Cyclists from Zürich